This is a select bibliography of post World War II English language books (including translations) and journal articles about the history of Russia and its borderlands from the Mongol invasions until 1613. Book entries may have references to reviews published in academic journals or major newspapers when these could be considered helpful.

A brief selection of English translations of primary sources is included. The sections "General Surveys" and "Biographies" contain books; other sections contain both books and journal articles. Book entries have references to journal articles and reviews about them when helpful. Additional bibliographies can be found in many of the book-length works listed below; see Further Reading for several book and chapter-length bibliographies. The External Links section contains entries for publicly available select bibliographies from universities.

Inclusion criteria
Works included are referenced in the notes or bibliographies of scholarly secondary sources or journals. Included works should either be published by an academic or widely distributed publisher, be authored by a notable subject matter expert as shown by scholarly reviews and have significant scholarly journal reviews about the work. To keep the bibliography length manageable, only items that clearly meet the criteria should be included.

Citation style
This bibliography uses APA style citations. Entries do not use templates. References to reviews and notes for entries do use citation templates. Where books which are only partially related to Russian history are listed, the titles for chapters or sections should be indicated if possible, meaningful, and not excessive.

If a work has been translated into English, the translator should be included and a footnote with appropriate bibliographic information for the original language version should be included.

When listing works with titles or names published with alternative English spellings, the form used in the latest published version should be used and the version and relevant bibliographic information noted if it previously was published or reviewed under a different title.

General works

Period works (12231613)

 Alef, G. (1983). Rulers and Nobles in 15th-Century Muscovy. London, UK: Variorum.
 Birnbaum, H., Flier, M. S., & Rowland, D. B. (1984). Medieval Russian Culture. Berkeley, CA: University of California Press.
 Black, J. (Ed.). (1999). The Development of Russian Military Power, 1453–1815. In European Warfare, 1453–1815. New York: Macmillan.
 Lohr, E. & Poe, M. (Eds.). (2002). The Military and Society in Russia 1450-1917: 1450-1917. Leiden: Brill.
 Martin, J. (2007). Medieval Russia, 980–1584. Cambridge University Press.
 Meyendorff, J. (1997). Byzantium and the Rise of Russia: A Study of Byzantino-Russian Relations in the Fourteenth Century. St Vladimirs Seminary Press.
 Ostrowski, D., & Poe, M. T. (Eds.). (2011). Portraits of Old Russia: Imagined Lives of Ordinary People, 1300-1745. London, UK: Routledge.
 Pelenski, J. (1998). The Contest for the Legacy of Kievan Rus’. New York, NY: East European Monographs, Columbia University.
 Presniakov, A. E. (1970). The Formation of the Great Russian State. A Study of Russian History in the Thirteenth to Fifteenth Centuries. (A. E. Moorhouse, Trans.) Chicago: Quadrangle Books.

Mongols

 Allsen, T. (1981). Mongol Census Taking in Rus', 1245-1275. Harvard Ukrainian Studies, 5(1), 32–53.
 Allsen, T. (2001). Culture and Conquest in Mongol Eurasia. Cambridge: Cambridge University Press.
 Fennell, J. (2017). The Crisis of Medieval Russia 1200-1304. London, UK: Routledge.
 Halperin, C. (1987). Russia and the Golden Horde: The Mongol Impact on Medieval Russian History. Indiana University Press.
 Inalcik, H. (1979). The Khan and the Tribal Aristocracy: The Crimean Khanate under Sahib Giray I. Harvard Ukrainian Studies, 3/4, 445–466. 
 Langer, L. (2017). Rus’ and the Mongol Decimal System. Russian History, 44(4), 515–533.
 Martin, J. (1992). Muscovite Frontier Policy: The Case Of The Khanate Of Kasimov. Russian History, 19(1/4), 169–179.
 Morgan, D. (1986). The Mongols. Hoboken, NJ: Blackwell Publishers.
 Ostrowski, D. (1990). The Mongol Origins of Muscovite Political Institutions. Slavic Review, 49(4), 525–542. 
 Pritsak, O. (1967). Moscow, the Golden Horde, and the Kazan Khanate from a Polycultural Point of View. Slavic Review, 26(4), 577–583.
 Sverdrup, C. F. (2020). The Mongol Conquests: The Military Operations of Genghis Khan and Sube’etei. London: Helion and Company.
 Vernadsky, G. (1973). The Mongols and Russia (A History of Russia, Vol.3). New Haven, CT: Yale University Press.
 Zdan, M. B. (1957). The Dependence of Halych-Volyn' Rus' on the Golden Horde. The Slavonic and East European Review, 35(85), 505–522.

Muscovite

 Alef, G. (1966). The Adoption of the Muscovite Two-Headed Eagle: A Discordant View. Speculum, 41(1), 1-21.
 Alef, G. (1983). Rulers and Nobles in 15th-Century Muscovy. Farnham, UK: Ashgate Publishing.
 Alef, G. (1986). The Origins of Muscovite Autocracy: The Age of Ivan III. Berlin: Osteuropa-Institut.<
 Brown, P. (1983). Muscovite Government Bureaus. Russian History, 10(3), 269–330. 
 Brown, P. (2009). How Muscovy Governed: Seventeenth-Century Russian Central Administration. Russian History, 36(4), 459–529.
 Backus, O. P. (1957). Motives of West Russian nobles in deserting Lithuania for Moscow, 1377-1514. Lawrence, KS: University of Kansas Press.
 Croskey, R. M. (1987). Muscovite Diplomatic Practice in the Reign of Ivan III. New York: Garland.
 Crummey, R. O. (1987). The Formation of Muscovy 1304—1613. London, UK: Routledge.
 Crummey, R. (1987). New Wine In Old Bottles? Ivan Iv And Novgorod. Russian History, 14(1/4), 61–76. 
 Davies, B. (1987). The Town Governors In The Reign Of Ivan IV. Russian History, 14(1/4), 77-143. 
 Fennell, J. (1968). The Emergence of Moscow 1304-1359. London: Harvill Secker#Secker & Warburg.
 Halperin, C. (2012). Simeon Bekbulatovich and Mongol Influence on Ivan IV's Muscovy. Russian History, 39(3), 306–330. 
 Halperin, C. J. (2000). Muscovite Political Institutions in the 14th Century. Kritika: Explorations in Russian and Eurasian History, 1(2), 237–257. 
 Halperin, C. J. (2002). Muscovy as a Hypertrophic State: A Critique. Kritika: Explorations in Russian and Eurasian History, 3(3), 501–507.
 Keenan, E. (1967). Muscovy and Kazan: Some Introductory Remarks on the Patterns of Steppe Diplomacy. Slavic Review, 26(4), 548–558.
 Keenan, E. (1986). Muscovite Political Folkways. The Russian Review, 45(2), 115–181.
 Kivelson, V. (2002). Muscovite "Citizenship": Rights without Freedom. The Journal of Modern History, 74(3), 465–489.
 Kollmann, N. S. (1986). Ritual and Social Drama at the Muscovite Court. Slavic Review, 45(3), 486–502. 
 Kollmann, N. S. (1987). Kinship and Politics: The Making of the Muscovite Political System, 1345-1547. Stanford, CA: Stanford University Press.
 Kollmann, N. S. (1986). Consensus Politics: The Dynastic Crisis of the 1490s Reconsidered. The Russian Review, 45(3), 235–267. 
 Kotilaine, J., & Poe, M. (Eds.). (2004). Modernizing Muscovy: Reform and Social Change in Seventeenth-Century Russia. London, UK: Routledge.
 Martin, J. (1992). Muscovite Frontier Policy: The Case of the Khanate of Kasimov. Russian History, 19(1/4), 169–179. 
 Ostrowski, D. (1990). The Mongol Origins of Muscovite Political Institutions. Slavic Review, 49(4), 525–542.
 Ostrowski, D. (1998). Muscovy and the Mongols: Cross-Cultural Influences on the Steppe Frontier, 1304–1589. Cambridge, UK: Cambridge University Press.
 Pelenski, J. (1967). Muscovite Imperial Claims to the Kazan Khanate. Slavic Review, 26(4), 559–576.
 Pelenski, J. (1979). The Sack of Kiev of 1482 in Contemporary Muscovite Chronicle Writing. Harvard Ukrainian Studies, 3/4, 638–649.
 Pelenski, J. (1983). The Emergence of the Muscovite Claims to the Byzantine-Kievan "Imperial Inheritance". Harvard Ukrainian Studies, 7, 520–531.
 Raba, J. (1976). The Authority of the Muscovite Ruler at the Dawn of the Modern Era. Jahrbücher Für Geschichte Osteuropas, 24(3), neue folge, 321–344.

Tsardom of Russia

 Bogatyrev, S. (2007). Reinventing the Russian Monarchy in the 1550s: Ivan the Terrible, the Dynasty, and the Church. The Slavonic and East European Review, 85(2), 271–293. 
 Bushkovitch, P. (2014). The Testament of Ivan the Terrible. Kritika: Explorations in Russian and Eurasian History, 15(3), 653–656. 
 ———. (2021). Succession to the Throne in Early Modern Russia: The Transfer of Power 1450–1725. New York: Cambridge University Press.
 Fennell, J. (1987). Ivan IV As A Writer. Russian History, 14(1/4), 145–154.
 Grobovsky, A. N. (1969). The "Chosen Council" of Ivan IV: A Reinterpretation. Brooklyn, N.Y: T. Gaus' Sons.
 Halperin, C. (2003). Ivan IV and Chinggis Khan. Jahrbücher Für Geschichte Osteuropas, 51(4), neue folge, 481–497. 
 ———. (2007). Ivan IV's Insanity. Russian History, 34(1/4), 207–218. 
 Hellie, R. (1987). What Happened? How Did He Get Away With It?: Ivan Groznyi's Paranoia And The Problem Of Institutional Restraints. Russian History, 14(1/4), 199–224. 
 Hunt, P. (1993). Ivan IV's Personal Mythology of Kingship. Slavic Review, 52(4), 769–809.
 Khodarkovsky, M. (1999). Of Christianity, Enlightenment, and Colonialism: Russia in the North Caucasus, 1500–1800. Journal of Modern History, 71(2), 394–430.
 Kleimola, A. (1987). Ivan The Terrible And His "Go-Fers": Aspects Of State Security In The 1560s. Russian History, 14(1/4), 283–292.
 Miller, D. (1967). The Coronation of Ivan IV of Moscow. Jahrbücher Für Geschichte Osteuropas, 15(4), neue folge, 559–574. 
 ———. (1994). Creating Legitimacy: Ritual, Ideology, And Power In Sixteenth-Century Russia. Russian History, 21(3), 289–315. 
 Perrie, M. (1987). The Image of Ivan the Terrible in Russian Folklore. Cambridge: Cambridge University Press.
 Pouncy, C. (2006). Missed Opportunities and the Search for Ivan the Terrible. Kritika: Explorations in Russian and Eurasian History, 7(2), 309–328. 
 Rowland, D. (1990). Did Muscovite Literary Ideology Place Limits on the Power of the Tsar (1540s-1660s)?. The Russian Review, 49(2), 125–155.
 Waugh, D. (1987). The Unsolved Problem Of Tsar Ivan IV's Library. Russian History, 14(1/4), 395–408. 
 Yaşar, M. (2016). The North Caucasus between the Ottoman Empire and the Tsardom of Muscovy: The Beginnings, 1552-1570. Iran & the Caucasus, 20(1), 105–125.

Time of Troubles

 Dunning, C. S. L. (1995). Crisis, Conjuncture, and the Causes of the Time of Troubles. Harvard Ukrainian Studies, 19, 97-119. 
 ———. (2001). Russia’s First Civil War: The Time of Troubles and the Founding of the Romanov Dynasty. Philadelphia: Penn State University Press.
 ———. (2003). Terror in the Time of Troubles. Kritika: Explorations in Russian and Eurasian History, 4(3), 491–513. 
 Perrie, M. (1982). Popular Socio-Utopian Legends' in the Time of Troubles. The Slavonic and East European Review, 60(2), 221–243. 
 ———. (1995). Pretenders and Popular Monarchism in Early Modern Russia: The False Tsars of the Time of Troubles. Cambridge: Cambridge University Press.
 Platonov, S. F. (1970). The Time of Troubles: A Historical Study of the Internal Crisis and Social Struggle in Sixteenth and Seventeenth-Century Muscovy. Lawrence, KS: University Press of Kansas.

Topical works

Indigenous peoples and ethnic groups
 Kappeler, A., Kohut, Z. E., Sysyn, F. E., & von Hagen, M. (Eds.). (2003). Culture, nation, and identity: the Ukrainian-Russian encounter, 1600–1945. Toronto: Canadian Institute of Ukrainian Studies Press.

Religion and philosophy
 Bogatyrev, S. (2007). Reinventing the Russian Monarchy in the 1550s: Ivan the Terrible, the Dynasty, and the Church. The Slavonic and East European Review, 85(2), 271–293. 
 Bremer, T. (2013). Cross and Kremlin: A Brief History of the Orthodox Church in Russia (E. W. Gritsch, Trans.; Translation edition). Grand Rapids, MI: Eerdmans.
 Bogatyrev, S. (2007). Reinventing the Russian Monarchy in the 1550s: Ivan the Terrible, the Dynasty, and the Church. The Slavonic and East European Review, 85(2), 271–293. 
 Bushkovitch, P. (1992). Religion and Society in Russia: The Sixteenth and Seventeenth Centuries. Oxford: Oxford University Press.
 Challis, N., & Dewey, H. (1987). Basil The Blessed, Holy Fool Of Moscow. Russian History, 14(1/4), 47–59.
 Clucas, L. (Ed.). (1988). The Byzantine Legacy in Eastern Europe. Boulder, CO: East European Monographs.
 Franklin, S. (2002). Byzantium-Rus-Russia: Studies in the translation of Christian culture. Ashgate/Variorum.
 Gruber, I. (2012). Orthodox Russia in Crisis: Church and Nation in the Time of Troubles. DeKalb, IL: Northern Illinois University Press.
 Gudziak, B. A. (2001). Crisis and Reform: The Kyivan Metropolitanate, the Patriarchate of Constantinople, and the Genesis of the Union of Brest (Harvard Series In Ukrainian Studies). Cambridge: Harvard Ukrainian Research Institute.
 Hunt, P. (1993). Ivan IV's Personal Mythology of Kingship. Slavic Review, 52(4), 769–809.
 Ivanov, A. A. (2020). A Spiritual Revolution: The Impact of Reformation and Enlightenment in Orthodox Russia. Madison: University of Wisconsin Press.
 Kaiser, D. H. (2006). Church Control over Marriage in Seventeenth-Century Russia. The Russian Review, 65(4), 567–585.
 Khodarkovsky, M. (1996). "Not by Word Alone": Missionary Policies and Religious Conversion in Early Modern Russia. Comparative Studies in Society and History, 38(2), 267–293.
 Khodarkovsky M. & Geraci R. (Eds.), (2001). Of Religion and Empire: Missions, Conversion, and Tolerance in Tsarist Russia. Ithaca, NY: Cornell University Press.
 Kivelson, V. A., & Worobec, C. D. (Eds.). (2020). Witchcraft in Russia and Ukraine, 1000–1900: A Sourcebook (NIU Series in Slavic, East European, and Eurasian Studies). DeKalb: Northern Illinois University Press.
 Meyendorff, P. (1991). Russia, Ritual, and Reform: The Liturgical Reforms of Nikon in the 17th Century: Liturgical Reforms of Nikon in the Seventeenth Century. St Vladimirs Seminary Press.
 Pliguzov, A. I. (2023). Documentary Sources on the History of Rus´ Metropolitanate: The Fourteenth to the Early Sixteenth Centuries (Harvard Series In Ukrainian Studies). Cambridge: Harvard Ukrainian Research Institute.
 Romaniello, M. (2007). Mission Delayed: The Russian Orthodox Church after the Conquest of Kazan. Church History, 76(3), 511–540. 
 Rosenthal, B. G. (Ed.). (1997). The Occult in Russian and Soviet Culture. New York: Cornell University Press.
 Shepard, J. (2017). The Expansion of Orthodox Europe: Byzantium, the Balkans and Russia. London, UK: Routledge.
 Shubin, D. H. (2005). A History of Russian Christianity (4 vols.). New York: Agathon Press
 Thyret, I. (2001). Between God and Tsar: Religious Symbolism and the Royal Women of Muscovite Russia. DeKalb, IL: Northern Illinois University Press.
 Weickhardt, G. (2012). Muscovite Law on Monasteries. Russian History, 39(1/2), 13–41.

Other studies
 Hartley, J. M. (2021). The Volga: A History. New Haven: Yale University Press.
 Koloda, V., & Gorbanenko, S. (2020). Agriculture in the Forest-Steppe Region of Khazaria (East Central and Eastern Europe in the Middle Ages, 450–1450, Vol. 60). Leiden: Brill.
 Rowland, D. B. (2020). God, Tsar, and People: The Political Culture of Early Modern Russia (NIU Series in Slavic, East European, and Eurasian Studies). Ithaca: Cornell University Press.

Biographies

Ivan the Great

 Fennell, J. L. I. (1963). Ivan The Great Of Moscow. New York: Macmillan.
 Grey, I. (1964). Ivan III and the Unification of Russia. London, UK: English Universities Press.

Ivan the Terrible

 Bogatyrev, S. (2007). Reinventing the Russian Monarchy in the 1550s: Ivan the Terrible, the Dynasty, and the Church. The Slavonic and East European Review, 85(2), 271–293. 
 Cherniavsky, M. (1968). Ivan the Terrible as Renaissance Prince. Slavic Review, 27(2), 195–211.
 Keenan, E. (2006). How Ivan Became "Terrible". Harvard Ukrainian Studies, 28(1/4), 521–542.
 Macnee, C. (1971). Ivan the Terrible. Fortnight, (10), 2-2.
 Madariaga, I. de, (2006). Ivan the Terrible. New Haven, CT: Yale University Press.
 Perrie, M., & Pavlov, A. (2016). Ivan the Terrible. London: Routledge.

Other biographies
 Barbour, P. L. (1967). Dimitry, Called the Pretender, Tsar and Great Prince of All Russia, 1605 –1606. London: Macmillan.
 Hughes, D. L. (1990). Sophia, Regent of Russia: 1657-1704. New Haven, CT: Yale University Press.
 Longworth, P. (1984). Alexis: Tsar of All the Russias. New York: Vintage.

Other works
 Lubimenko, I. (1914). The Correspondence of Queen Elizabeth with the Russian Czars. The American Historical Review, 19(3), 525–542.
 Neuberger, J. (2014). Sergei Eisenstein’s Ivan the Terrible as History. The Journal of Modern History, 86(2), 295–334.

Historiography
 Confino, M. (2009). The New Russian Historiography, and the Old—Some Considerations. History and Memory, 21(2), 7-33. 
 Filiushkin, A. I. (2002). Post-Modernism and the Study of the Russian Middle Ages. Kritika: Explorations in Russian and Eurasian History, 3(1), 89–109. 
 Graham, H. (1987). How Do We Know What We Know About Ivan The Terrible? (A Paradigm). Russian History, 14(1/4), 179–198.
 Halperin, C. (1982). Soviet Historiography on Russia and the Mongols. The Russian Review, 41(3), 306–322.
 Karpovich, M. (1943). Klyuchevski and Recent Trends in Russian Historiography. Slavonic and East European Review. American Series, 2(1), 31–39.
 Kivelson, V. A. (2002). On Words, Sources, and Historical Method: Which Truth about Muscovy? Kritika: Explorations in Russian and Eurasian History, 3(3), 487–499. 
 Kollmann, N. S. (2001). Convergence, Expansion, and Experimentation: Current Trends in Muscovite History-Writing. Kritika: Explorations in Russian and Eurasian History, 2(2), 233–240. 
 Kollmann, N. (1987). The Grand Prince In Muscovite Politics: The Problem Of Genre In Sources On Ivan's Minority. Russian History, 14(1/4), 293–313.
 Mazour, A. (1937). Modern Russian Historiography. The Journal of Modern History, 9(2), 169–202. 
 Miller, D. (1986). The Kievan Principality in the Century before the Mongol Invasion: An Inquiry into Recent Research and Interpretation. Harvard Ukrainian Studies, 10(1/2), 215–240.
 Thaden, E. (1987). Ivan IV In Baltic German Historiography. Russian History, 14(1/4), 377–394.
 Vernadsky, G., & Pushkarev, S. G. (1978). Russian Historiography: A History. Belmont, MA: Nordland Publishing.

Primary Sources
A limited number of English language translated primary sources referred to in the above works.
 Cross, S. H. (2012). The Russian Primary Chronicle: Laurentian Text (O. P. Sherbowitz-Wetzor, Ed.). Cambridge, MA: Medieval Academy of America.
 Kaiser, D. H., & Marker, G. (1994). Reinterpreting Russian History: Readings, 860-1860s (First Edition). Oxford, UK: Oxford University Press.
 Pliguzov, A. I. (2023). Documentary Sources on the History of Rus´ Metropolitanate: The Fourteenth to the Early Sixteenth Centuries (Harvard Series In Ukrainian Studies). Cambridge: Harvard Ukrainian Research Institute.
 Zenkovsky, S. A. (Ed.). (1963). Medieval Russia’s epics, chronicles, and tales (First edition). New York, NY: E. P. Dutton.

Reference works

Academic journals

Further reading
Many of the above works contain bibliographies. Included below are a selection of works with large bibliographies related to Russian history.
 Langer, L. N. (2001). Bibliography. In Historical Dictionary of Medieval Russia. Lanham, MD: The Scarecrow Press.
 Perrie, M. (2006). Bibliography. (2006). In M. Perrie (Ed.), The Cambridge History of Russia (The Cambridge History of Russia, Vol. 1, pp. 663–721). Cambridge: Cambridge University Press.
 Poe, M. (1995). Foreign Descriptions of Muscovy: An Analytic Bibliography of Primary and Secondary Sources. Bloomington, IN: Slavica Publishers.

See also
 Bibliography of the history of the Early Slavs and Rus'
 Bibliography of Russian history (1613–1917)
 Bibliography of Ukrainian history
 Bibliography of the history of Belarus and Byelorussia
 Bibliography of the history of Poland

References

Notes

Citations

External links
 Everyday life and microhistory in Russia: A selected bibliography of critical studies. Indiana University, Bloomington.
 Janet Martin—Bibliography. (2015). Russian History, 42(1), 3–8.

 
 
 
Bibliography
Bibliography
Bibliography
History (1223–1613)
Russia